Railway coaches are classified under an international system developed by the UIC. This UIC classification of railway coaches replaced earlier national classification schemes in many countries, such as Germany. The coach class is expressed as a combination of letters. It is sometimes followed, for example in the Deutsche Bahn AG, by a three-figure class number. In a broader sense the vehicle number displayed on the coach is also part of its classification, because it encodes other technical details such as the top speed or the type of heating system used.

For example the full designation of a passenger coach, including its coach number, looks like this:

73 80 29-94 708-7 Bpmbz 293.6

This article explains how this classification code on the sole bar of each coach may be decoded.

Main letters 

The classification of a coach begins with one or more class letters, in our example above, a capital B. It describes the general class of coach:

Secondary letters (Deutsche Bahn AG) 

The following lower-case letters follow the main letters and describe the technical equipment and fittings of the coach. How the letters are used, is at least partly up to the individual railway company. This overview is based on the system used by the Deutsche Bahn AG:

 i
 formerly: local- or regional-traffic passenger (Nah- oder Regionalverkehrswagen) coach with center aisle, gangway without rubber connectors
 formerly: InterRegio coach
 l
 regional-traffic passenger coach (Regionalverkehrswagen) with length of more than 24.5 metres, centre aisle in 2nd class, centre aisle or side corridor in 1st class, rubber gangway connectors (currently not used)
 m
 long-distance passenger coach (Fernverkehrswagen) with length of more than 24.5 metres, rubber gangway connectors (except on DDm)
 mm
 long-distance modified passenger coach (Fernverkehrswagen) with length of more than 24.5 metres, rubber gangway connectors
 n
 local-traffic passenger coach (Nahverkehrswagen) with length of more than 24.5 metres, centre aisle in 2nd class, centre aisle or side corridor in 1st class, two centre doors, with 36-pole control cable for push-pull operations
 x
 local-traffic passenger coach (S-Bahn) with centre aisle, centre doors, high performance brakes, bus bar for current collection, push-pull operations by default
 y
 regional-traffic passenger coach (Regionalverkehrswagen) with length of more than 24.5 m, centre aisle in 2nd class, centre aisle or side corridor in 1st class, two centre doors, with 34-pole control cable for push-pull operations

 b
 coach with equipment for the disabled (behindertengerecht)
 formerly: coach with command-control cabling (Befehls-Leitung)
 c
 couchette coach, compartment seats can be converted to couchettes
 d
 coach with luggage, multi-purpose or bicycle section
 k
 coach with bistro, kiosk, kitchen section or snack machines
 o
 compartment coach with fewer number, without (ohne) air-conditioning
 p
 open coach with centre aisle (pullman type), air-conditioned
 s
 on luggage vans: side corridor (Seitengang)
 on sleepers: Special type (small single- or twin-bed compartments)
 on compartment coaches: Service compartment
 v
 compartment coach with fewer (verringerter) number (11 instead of 12 on Bm, 9 instead of 10 on Am, 6/4 instead of 6/5 on ABm), air-conditioned
 w
 compartment coach with way fewer number (9 instead of 12 Bm, former Am)
 formerly: seats with padding (weich) also in former third class and then new second class

 r
 coach with high-performance brakes (Rapid-Bremse) KE-GPR (only with n or Post)
 f
 coach with driving cab (Führerstand), 36-pole control cabling or time-division multiplexed push-pull operations
 q
 coach with driving cab, 34-pole control cabling for push-pull operations (only non-modernised vehicles without n or y)
 u
 coach with 34-pole control cable for push-pull operations
 uu
 coach with 36-pole control cable for push-pull operations (included in f or n)

 h
 coach which power supply from axle generators (some with additional bus-bar)
 formerly: non-converted local passenger train coaches of Reichsbahn origin
 z
 coach with power supply from bus-bar (no axle generators)

 a
 coach with automatic door operation (TAV)
 e
 formerly: coach with electrical heating

Secondary letters (Austrian Federal Railways) 

The Austrian Railways use different secondary letters for twin- and four-axled coaches. The following letters have been in force since 1981. The letters d for double-decker coach, l for push-pull coaches and s for driving cars are written after a dash (e.g.: Bmpz-ds).

Secondary letters (SNCF) 
In addition to secondary letters, SNCF includes superscript characters to indicate the number of compartments or sections within a coach. (Example = A8tuj)

Secondary letters (Swiss Federal Railways) 

The Swiss Federal Railways currently uses secondary letters for their fleet of Eurofima coaches and to denote special type carriages.

Vehicle number 

The fifth digit of the Coach number defines the type:

 0 = private coach
 1 = first class seating coach (A)
 2 = second seating class coach (B)
 3 = mixed classes seating coach (AB)
 4 = first or mixed class couchette coach (Ac, ABc)
 5 = second class couchette coach (Bc)
 7 = sleeper coach (any class)

See also 

 UIC identification marking for tractive stock
 UIC classification of locomotive axle arrangements
 UIC passenger coach types
 UIC classification of goods wagons
 UIC country codes

Sources 

 Reisezugwagen-Gattungszeichen

Passenger rail transport
 Passenger coaches
Classification of railway coaches
Rolling stock classification systems
Railway vehicles register numbers